Quesnel (Kee-nel in French) is a city located in the Cariboo Regional District of British Columbia, Canada. Located nearly evenly between the cities of Prince George and Williams Lake, it is on the main route to northern British Columbia and the Yukon. Quesnel is located at the confluence of the Fraser River and Quesnel River. Quesnel's metropolitan area has a population of 23,146 making it the largest urban center between Prince George and Kamloops.

Quesnel is a sister city to Shiraoi, Japan. Quesnel hosted the 2000 British Columbia Winter Games, a biennial provincial amateur sports competition. To the east of Quesnel is Wells, Barkerville, and Bowron Lake Provincial Park, a popular canoeing destination in the Cariboo Mountains.

History

Long before the arrival of prospectors during the Cariboo Gold Rush of 1862, the Southern Carrier (Dakelh) people lived off the land around Quesnel, occupying the area from the Bowron Lakes in the east to the upper Blackwater River and Dean River in the west. The Southern Carrier Nation were known among themselves as ‘Uda Ukelh’, meaning ‘people who travel by boat on water early in the morning’. The name "Quesnel" is derived from Jules Maurice Quesnel, who accompanied Simon Fraser on his journey to the Pacific Ocean. Quesnel came to be called 'Quesnelle Mouth' to distinguish it from Quesnel Forks,  up river. In 1870, it had been shortened to Quesnelle and by 1900, it was spelled the way it is now. Quesnel is located along the gold mining trail known as the Cariboo Wagon Road and was the commercial centre of the Cariboo Gold Rush. It also marks one end of the Alexander MacKenzie Heritage Trail.
Because of its location on the Fraser River, it was also an important landing for sternwheelers from 1862 to 1886 and then, from 1909 until 1921. The last sternwheeler on the upper Fraser was Quesnel's own namesake craft, and home town product, the Quesnel. Quesnel was incorporated in 1928.

Geography and climate
 Location: 
 Elevation: 
 Average annual snowfall: 
 Average annual rainfall: 
 Frost free days: 179
 Average winter temperature: 
 Extreme minimum temperature: 
 Average summer temperature: 
 Extreme maximum temperature: 
 Time Zone: Pacific Time Zone

Climate
Considering it is located inland and around the 53rd parallel north, Quesnel's humid continental climate (Dfb) is mild by Canadian standards, being subject to marine airflows from the Pacific. Overnight lows are still cool even in summer, but daytime temperatures average above  in that season according to Environment and Climate Change Canada.

Demographics
According to the same census, Quesnel had a census agglomeration population of 23,113, which represented a decrease from 23,146 in the 2016 census.

The median household income in 2015 for Quesnel was $60,651, which is slightly below the British Columbia provincial average of $69,995.

As of 2018, the population of Quesnel is estimated to be a little over 10,000 people living within the city, with roughly 13,000 people living outside the city limits but within the metro area.

Ethnicity

Religion 
According to the 2021 census, religious groups in Quesnel included:
Irreligion (6,050 persons or 62.5%)
Christianity (3,260 persons or 33.7%)
Sikhism (185 persons or 1.9%)
Hinduism (70 persons or 0.7%)
Buddhism (15 persons or 0.2%)
Indigenous Spirituality (10 persons or 0.1%)
Other (90 persons or 0.9%)

Economy 
Quesnel is a city known for its forestry, particularly the production of pulp and lumber. Forestry is the single biggest employer in Quesnel. Quesnel is home to a massive paper mill that was built in 1981. The mill is currently run by West Fraser Timber.

Administration
Quesnel's city government consists of a seven-member council, that is one mayor and six Councillors. The current city council, elected in 2022 for a four-year term, is composed of Mayor Ron Paul and Councillors Scott Elliott, Tony Goulet, Debora McKelvie, Laurey-Anne Roodenburg, Martin Runge, and Mitch Vik.

Education
Quesnel is part of School District 28, which contains several elementary schools, as well as a Junior and a Senior Secondary School (Quesnel Junior High School and Correlieu Senior Secondary School respectively). Also, within the school district is McNaughton Centre which is an Alternate High school. For post secondary education, Quesnel has the College of New Caledonia and University of Northern British Columbia shared campus, which offers several programs, including four year nursing and social work degrees, foundation or apprenticeship-level trades certification, health sciences, human services, academic upgrading, or industry and continuing education courses. The Quesnel CNC Campus also offers students the chance to start arts or sciences degrees and then, transfer to university.

Transportation

Quesnel is served by the Quesnel Airport, with several commercial flights daily to and from Vancouver, BC. The city has a local transit system provided by BC Transit.

Healthcare
Quesnel is served by GR Baker Memorial Hospital.

Tourism

Quesnel's tourism industry is largely based on the city's access to nature, with hunting and guiding outfitters, fishing, hiking, canoeing. The Rocky Mountaineer, a rail-tour train also travels through and stops overnight in Quesnel at the Pacific Great Eastern Railway Station.

Quesnel's history as a gold-rush town is also reflected, as there are over 30 heritage sites around the city. Quesnel is home to the world's largest gold pan, measured at 5.5 m in diameter and weighing 1400 kg, although this is disputed by Nome, Alaska. The gold pan currently resides in its new controversial location beside the heritage train station. Quesnel is also the closest city to Barkerville, one of the largest historical towns in western North America.

Troll Ski Resort, or simply Troll, is located 44 kilometers (27 miles) east of the city. Quesnel is also home to Hallis Lake Cross Country Skiing Facility, a 75 kilometer network of trails maintained by the Cariboo Ski Touring Club for cross-country skiing and snowshoeing. In addition, Ten Mile Lake Provincial Park, Pinnacles Provincial Park, and Dragon Mountain Provincial Park are also located just outside the city.

Quesnel Museum is home to numerous artifacts, including Mandy, a "haunted doll" made in the early 20th century that is claimed to have paranormal abilities and eyes that follow visitors around. Mandy appeared on the Montel Williams Show.

Culture
There are twenty-three decorated fire hydrants in the streets of Quesnel. This work was sponsored by the local businesses in the vicinity of the hydrants.

Sports
Quesnel is home to the Central Interior Hockey League's Quesnel Kangaroos Senior AA hockey team. The team plays at the West Fraser Centre in Quesnel. The city was formerly home to the Quesnel Millionaires, a BCHL team, before they relocated to Chilliwack as the Chilliwack Chiefs in 2011.

Quesnel also has soccer, airsoft and paintball, minor baseball, softball, lacrosse, ringette, roller derby, and football leagues. A Mountain biking skills park is located behind the Rec Center and West Quesnel has a skateboard park known as the Quesnel Skatepark.

Notable people

Brett Festerling – former National Hockey League Player (Anaheim Ducks & Winnipeg Jets)
Aaron Gagnon – former National Hockey League Player (Dallas Stars & Winnipeg Jets)
Bob Gassoff – former National Hockey League player (St. Louis Blues)
Brad Gassoff – former National Hockey League player (Vancouver Canucks)
Rory MacDonald – Mixed martial artist currently with Bellator MMA in the Welterweight division
Jim Marsh – former World Hockey Association player (Birmingham Bulls)
Errol Rausse – former National Hockey League player (Washington Capitals)

Neighbourhoods and nearby communities
West Quesnel
 Uplands
 Riverview
 West Riverside
South Quesnel
 Southhills
 Red Bluff
 Dragon Lake
 Rich Bar
 North Quesnel
 Carson Sub
 Johnston Sub

Nearby communities, not part of the City of Quesnel, include:
 Moose Heights
 Ten Mile Lake (also locally referred to as Parkland)
 Barlow Creek
 West Fraser / Narcosli
Cottonwood
Nazko
Bouchie Lake
Kersley

Images

Sister City
  Shiraoi, Japan

Notes

References

External links

Cities in British Columbia
Populated places on the Fraser River
Geography of the Cariboo
Populated places in the Cariboo Regional District
Hudson's Bay Company trading posts